A Woman's Heart is a compilation of twelve tracks performed by six female Irish artists, namely Eleanor McEvoy, Mary Black, Dolores Keane, Sharon Shannon, Frances Black and Maura O'Connell. The album was released in July 1992 and sold over 750,000 copies, more than any other album in Irish chart history and nearly one million copies worldwide.

The 20th anniversary of its release was celebrated with four sold-out performances at the Olympia Theatre in Dublin, Ireland. Eleanor McEvoy, Mary Coughlan, Sharon Shannon, Dolores Keane, Wallis Bird and Hermione Hennessy were on the bill.

In April 2012, Kiera Murphy produced a documentary entitled Our Woman's Hearts which explores how A Woman's Heart came about, why it became so popular, and the effect it has had on three generations of some Irish women. The documentary was a part of RTÉ Radio 1's series Documentary on One.

The RTÉ Concert Orchestra performed an orchestrated version of the album with McEvoy, O'Connell and Wallis Bird in February 2020 at the National Concert Hall, and a similar concert has been announced for May 2022 in the Bord Gáis Energy Theatre.

"The Secret of Living", written by Eleanor McEvoy was released in July 2012 to celebrate the 20th Anniversary of the A Woman's Heart. The song is performed by Eleanor McEvoy, Mary Coughlan, Sharon Shannon, Gemma Hayes and Hermione Hennessey.

Track listing 
  "Only a Woman's Heart" – composed and sung by Eleanor McEvoy, performed with Mary Black
  "Caledonia" – Dolores Keane
  "Vanities" – Mary Black
  "Blackbird" – Sharon Shannon
  "Wall of Tears" – Frances Black
  "Summerfly" – Written by Cheryl Wheeler sung by Maura O'Connell
  "Island" – Dolores Keane
  "I Hear You Breathing In" – Eleanor McEvoy
  "Sonny" – Mary Black
 "Coridinio" – Sharon Shannon
 "Living in These Troubled Times" – Maura O'Connell
 "After the Ball" – Frances Black

References 

Compilation albums by Irish artists
1992 compilation albums
Women in music